The 2002 NCAA Men's Water Polo Championship was the 34th annual NCAA Men's Water Polo Championship to determine the national champion of NCAA men's collegiate water polo. Tournament matches were played at the Burns Aquatic Center on the campus of Loyola Marymount University in Los Angeles, California during December 2002.

Stanford defeated rival California in the final, 7–6, to win their tenth national title. The Cardinal (24–5) were coached by John Vargas.

The Most Outstanding Player of the tournament was again Tony Azevedo from Stanford. Azevedo, along with six other players, also comprised the All-Tournament Team. 

Azevedo, along with Queens College's Michael Vieira, were the tournament's leading scorers, with 5 goals each.

Qualification
Since there has only ever been one single national championship for water polo, all NCAA men's water polo programs (whether from Division I, Division II, or Division III) were eligible. A total of 4 teams were invited to contest this championship.

Bracket
Site: Burns Aquatics Center, Los Angeles, California

{{4TeamBracket-with 3rd
| Team-Width = 150
| RD1        = Semi-finals
| RD2        = Championship
| RD3        = Third Place

| RD1-seed1  = 
| RD1-team1  =  Stanford
| RD1-score1 = 10
| RD1-seed2  = 
| RD1-team2  =  UC San Diego
| RD1-score2 = 5

| RD1-seed3  = 
| RD1-team3  =  California
| RD1-score3 = 14
| RD1-seed4  = 
| RD1-team4  =  Queens (NY)
| RD1-score4 = 6

| RD2-seed1  = 
| RD2-team1  =  Stanford
| RD2-score1 = 7
| RD2-seed2  = 
| RD2-team2  =  California
| RD2-score2 = 6

| RD3-seed1  = 
| RD3-team1  =  UC San Diego
| RD3-score1 = 5
| RD3-seed2  = 
| RD3-team2  =  Queens (NY)
| RD3-score2 = 6OT
}}

 All-tournament team Tony Azevedo, Stanford''' (Most outstanding player)
Attila Banhidy, California
Nick Ellis, Stanford
Peter Hudnut, Stanford
Chris Lathrop, California
Andrew Stoddard, California
Michael Vieira, Queens (NY)

See also 
 NCAA Men's Water Polo Championship
 NCAA Women's Water Polo Championship

References

NCAA Men's Water Polo Championship
NCAA Men's Water Polo Championship
2002 in sports in California
December 2002 sports events in the United States
2002